Abrams Run is a stream in the U.S. state of West Virginia.

Abrams Run has the name of Abram Bennett, a pioneer who settled there.

Variant names
According to the Geographic Names Information System, it has also been known historically as:
Abram's Run

Course
Abrams Run rises west of Haytack Knob, in Lewis County, West Virginia and then flows generally northeast to join the West Fork River at Emmart.

Watershed
Abrams Run drains  of area, receives about 49.3 in/year of precipitation, has a wetness index of 284.52, and is about 78% forested.

See also
List of rivers of West Virginia

References

Rivers of Lewis County, West Virginia
Rivers of West Virginia